Bagneux-la-Fosse is a commune in the Aube department in the Grand Est region of north-central France.

The inhabitants of the commune are known as Bagnolais or Bagnolaises.

Geography
Bagneux-la-Fosse is located some 40 km east of Saint-Florentin and 15 km south-west of Bar-sur-Seine. Access to the commune is by the D32 road from Avirey-Lingey in the north which passes through the village before continuing south to join the D452 which continues to Channes. The D17 goes west from the village the north-west to Pargues. The D26 branches off the D32 north-east of the village and goes north-east to Neuville-sur-Seine. There is a large forest in the north-west of the commune and a smaller forest in the south-east with the rest of the commune farmland.

The Sarce river flows through the commune from south to north just east of the village and continues north to join the Seine at Virey-sous-Bar.

Neighbouring communes and villages

Administration

List of Successive Mayors

Demography
In 2017 the commune had 168 inhabitants.

Sites and monuments
The Church (15th century) is registered as an historical monument. The church contains many items that are registered as historical objects:

A Pulpit (18th century)
A Tombstone (17th century)
The Tombstone of François Merey (18th century)
The Tombstone of Marie Viviane Leclerc (18th century)
The Tombstone of Nicolas Babeau (1696)
The lateral Altars (19th century)
2 Reliquaries (19th century)
A Monstrance (19th century)
A Processional Banner: Saint Valentine (19th century)
A Chasuble (19th century)
A Painting: Way of the Cross (19th century)
A Commemorative Plaque (1533)
An Eagle Lectern (19th century)
A Statuette on a Processional Staff: Virgin and child (disappeared) (18th century)
The Furniture in the Church

See also
Communes of the Aube department

References

External links
Bagneux-la-Fosse on Géoportail, National Geographic Institute (IGN) website 
Bagneux on the 1750 Cassini Map

Communes of Aube